Nikolay Todorov may refer to:

Nikolay Todorov (footballer, born 1964), Bulgarian midfielder and manager
Nikolay Todorov (footballer, born 1996), Bulgarian forward

See also
Nikolai Todorov (1921–2003), President of Bulgaria